Kenneth Neil Waddell (born September 11, 1953) is a former Democratic member of the North Carolina House of Representatives. Waddell represented the 46th district (including constituents in Columbus, Robeson, and Bladen counties) from 2013 until 2017. A farmer and retired educator, he previously served as mayor of Chadbourn, North Carolina.

Committee assignments

2015-2016 session
Transportation (Vice Chair)
Wildlife Resources (Vice Chair)
Agriculture
Education - Community Colleges
Finance
Health
Pensions and Retirement
State Personnel

2013-2014 session
Agriculture
Finance
State Personnel
Commerce and Job Development
Homeland Security, Military, and Veterans Affairs

Electoral history

2014

2012

2011

References

External links

Living people
1953 births
People from Columbus County, North Carolina
North Carolina State University alumni
Educators from North Carolina
21st-century American politicians
Democratic Party members of the North Carolina House of Representatives